Pro-Europeanism, sometimes called European Unionism, is a political position that favours European integration and membership of the European Union (EU).

Political position 
Pro-Europeans are mostly classified as "centrist" (Renew Europe) in the context of European politics, including "centre-right" moderate conservatives (ex. EPP Group) and "centre-left" social democrats (ex. S&D and Greens/EFA). Pro-Europeanism is ideologically closely related to the Europe and Global liberal movement.

Pro-EU political parties

Pan-European level
 EU: Alliance of Liberals and Democrats for Europe Party, European Free Alliance, European Green Party, European People's Party, Party of European Socialists, Volt Europa

Within the EU
 Austria: Austrian People's Party, Social Democratic Party of Austria, The Greens – The Green Alternative, NEOS – The New Austria, Volt Austria
 Belgium: Reformist Mouvement, Open Flemish Liberals and Democrats, Socialist Party, Vooruit, Christian Democratic and Flemish, Les Engagés, Ecolo, Green, Democratic Federalist Independent, Volt Belgium
 Bulgaria: We Continue the Change, Yes, Bulgaria!, Union of Democratic Forces, Citizens for European Development of Bulgaria, Democrats for a Strong Bulgaria, Bulgarian Socialist Party (factions), Volt Bulgaria, Republicans for Bulgaria, Stand Up.BG, United People's Party, Bulgaria for Citizens Movement, Movement 21, There Is Such a People
 Croatia: Croatian Democratic Union, Social Democratic Party of Croatia, Croatian Peasant Party, Croatian People's Party – Liberal Democrats, Civic Liberal Alliance, Istrian Democratic Assembly, People's Party – Reformists, Croatian Social Liberal Party, Centre
 Cyprus: Democratic Rally, Democratic Party, Movement for Social Democracy, Democratic Alignment, New Wave – The Other Cyprus
 Czech Republic: TOP 09, Mayors and Independents, Christian and Democratic Union – Czechoslovak People's Party, Czech Pirate Party, Czech Social Democratic Party, Green Party, Volt Czech Republic
 Denmark: Danish Social Liberal Party, Social Democrats, Venstre, Conservative People's Party, Volt Denmark
 Estonia: Estonian Social Democratic Party, Estonian Reform Party, Estonian Greens, Isamaa
 Finland: Centre Party, National Coalition Party, Social Democratic Party of Finland, Green League, Swedish People's Party of Finland
 France: Renaissance, Democratic Movement, The Republicans, Socialist Party, Public Place, Radical Party of the Left, Europe Ecology – The Greens, The New Democrats, Génération.s, Radical Party, Union of Democrats and Independents, New Deal, Agir, En Commun, Horizons, Territories of Progress, Progressive Federation, Centrist Alliance, The Centrists, Ecologist Party, Democratic European Force, Volt France
 Germany: Alliance 90/The Greens, Christian Democratic Union, Christian Social Union in Bavaria, Social Democratic Party of Germany, Free Democratic Party, Die PARTEI, Volt Germany
 Greece: New Democracy, Syriza, PASOK – Movement for Change, Union of Centrists, Movement of Democratic Socialists, Volt Greece
 Hungary: Democratic Coalition, Jobbik, Hungarian Socialist Party, Momentum Movement, Dialogue for Hungary, LMP – Hungary's Green Party, Hungarian Liberal Party, New Start
 Ireland: Fine Gael, Fianna Fáil, Labour Party, Social Democrats, Green Party, Volt Ireland
 Italy: Democratic Party, Forza Italia, Italia Viva, More Europe, Volt Italy, Civic Commitment, Action, Italian Socialist Party, Social Democrats, Italian Republican Party, Solidary Democracy, Green Europe, Italian Radicals, Possible, Us of the Centre, Europeanists, Centrists for Europe, Moderates, Article One, European Republicans Movement, Forza Europa, Liberal Democratic Alliance for Italy, Alliance of the Centre (Italy), èViva, Sicilian Socialist Party, Team K
 Latvia: Unity, For Latvia's Development, Movement For!, The Conservatives, The Progressives
 Lithuania: Homeland Union, Liberals' Movement, Lithuanian Farmers and Greens Union, Social Democratic Party of Lithuania, Freedom Party, Labour Party, Lithuanian Green Party 
 Luxembourg: Christian Social People's Party, Luxembourg Socialist Workers' Party, Democratic Party, The Greens, Volt Luxembourg
 Malta: Nationalist Party, Labour Party (factions), AD+PD, Volt Malta
 Netherlands: Democrats 66, People's Party for Freedom and Democracy, Labour Party, Christian Democratic Appeal, GroenLinks, DENK, Volt Netherlands
 Poland: Civic Platform, Poland 2050, .Modern, Polish People's Party, New Left, Your Movement, The Greens, Polish Initiative, Union of European Democrats, Polish Socialist Party
 Portugal: Social Democratic Party, Socialist Party, People–Animals–Nature Party, LIVRE, Liberal Initiative, Volt Portugal
 Romania: Save Romania Union, National Liberal Party, People's Movement Party, Renewing Romania's European Project, PRO Romania, Green Party, NOW Party, Volt Romania
 Slovakia: Progressive Slovakia, Ordinary People and Independent Personalities, Christian Democratic Movement, Democrats, For the People, Voice – Social Democracy, Alliance
 Slovenia: Freedom Movement, Social Democrats, New Slovenia, Democratic Party of Pensioners of Slovenia, Slovenian People's Party 
 Spain: People's Party, Spanish Socialist Workers' Party, Citizens, Greens Equo, Volt Spain
 Sweden: Swedish Social Democratic Party, Moderate Party, Centre Party, Liberals, Christian Democrats, Volt Sweden

Outside the EU
 Albania: Democratic Party of Albania, Socialist Party of Albania, Freedom Party of Albania, Libra Party, Social Democratic Party of Albania, Republican Party of Albania, Unity for Human Rights Party, Alliance for Equality and European Justice, Volt Albania
 Armenia: Armenian Democratic Liberal Party, Armenian National Movement Party, Bright Armenia, Conservative Party, European Party of Armenia, For The Republic Party, Free Democrats, Heritage, Liberal Democratic Union of Armenia, National Progress Party of Armenia, People's Party of Armenia, Union for National Self-Determination, Republic Party, Rule of Law, Sasna Tsrer Pan-Armenian Party, Sovereign Armenia Party
 Belarus: Belarusian Christian Democracy, BPF Party, United Democratic Forces of Belarus, Party of Freedom and Progress, United Civic Party of Belarus, Belarusian Social Democratic Party (Assembly), Belarusian Social Democratic Assembly
 Bosnia and Herzegovina: Party of Democratic Action, Croatian Democratic Union of Bosnia and Herzegovina, Social Democratic Party of Bosnia and Herzegovina, Democratic Front, People and Justice, Party of Democratic Progress, Our Party, People's European Union, For New Generations, Union for a Better Future, Independent Bloc
 Georgia: Georgian Dream, United National Movement, Strategy Aghmashenebeli, Republican Party of Georgia, Lelo for Georgia, European Socialists, European Georgia, Georgian Labour Party, Free Democrats, For the People, Solidarity Alliance of Georgia
 Iceland: Social Democratic Alliance, Reform Party
 Kosovo: Alliance for the Future of Kosovo, Democratic League of Kosovo, Partia e Fortë
 Moldova: Party of Action and Solidarity, Liberal Party, Democratic Party, Liberal Democratic Party, European People's Party, Pro Moldova, People's Party of the Republic of Moldova
 Montenegro: Democratic Party of Socialists of Montenegro, Social Democratic Party of Montenegro, DEMOS, United Reform Action, Democratic Montenegro, Socialist People's Party, Liberal Party, Social Democrats, Bosniak Party, Civis, We won't give up Montenegro
 North Macedonia: Social Democratic Union, BESA, New Social Democratic Party, Democratic Union for Integration, Alliance for Albanians, Liberal Democratic Party, VMRO-NP
 Norway: Conservative Party, Labour Party (factions), Liberal Party
 Russia: Yabloko, People's Freedom Party, Green Alternative, Russia of the Future, Democratic Party of Russia
 San Marino: Civic 10, Euro-Populars for San Marino, Future Republic, Party of Democrats, Party of Socialists and Democrats, Sammarineses for Freedom, Socialist Party, Union for the Republic
 Serbia: Democratic Party, Social Democratic Party, Liberal Democratic Party, Movement of Free Citizens, People's Party, New Party, Serbian Progressive Party, Social Democratic Party of Serbia, Party of Freedom and Justice, Together for Serbia, Serbia 21, Civic Democratic Forum, Party of Modern Serbia, Movement for Reversal
 Switzerland: Social Democratic Party of Switzerland (factions), Green Party of Switzerland (factions), Green Liberal Party of Switzerland, Volt Switzerland
 Turkey: Democracy and Progress Party, Democratic Left Party, Democrat Party, Good Party, Liberal Democratic Party, Peoples' Democratic Party, Republican People's Party
 Ukraine: Servant of the People, Fatherland, European Solidarity, Voice, Self Reliance, Ukrainian People's Party, Our Ukraine, European Party of Ukraine, People's Front, Ukrainian Democratic Alliance for Reform, Volt Ukraine
 United Kingdom: Liberal Democrats, Green Party of England and Wales,  Scottish National Party (SNP), Social Democratic and Labour Party (SDLP), Scottish Greens, Women's Equality Party, Alliance Party of Northern Ireland, Green Party Northern Ireland, Mebyon Kernow, Alliance EPP: European People's Party UK, Volt UK, Animal Welfare Party

Pro-EU newspapers and magazines 
Note: Media outside of Europe may also be included.
 Denmark: Dagbladet Børsen, Politiken
 France: Le Figaro, Le Monde, Le Parisien
 Germany: Frankfurter Allgemeine Zeitung, Der Spiegel, Süddeutsche Zeitung, Der Tagesspiegel
 Hungary: Blikk
 Ireland: The Irish Times
 Japan: Chunichi Shimbun
 South Korea: The Hankyoreh
 Spain: El Confidencial
 United Kingdom: Financial Times, The Independent, The New European, The Guardian

Multinational European partnerships

 Council of Europe: an international organisation whose stated aim is to uphold human rights, democracy, rule of law in Europe and to promote European culture. It has 46 member states.
 Organization for Security and Co-operation in Europe: the world's largest security-oriented intergovernmental organization, with 57 participating states mostly in Europe and the Northern Hemisphere.
 Paneuropean Union: the oldest European unification movement.

See also

Eastern Partnership
Euromyth
European Federalist Party
European Union as an emerging superpower
Europeanism
Euroscepticism
Eurosphere
Eurovoc
Euronest Parliamentary Assembly
Federalisation of the European Union
Liberalism in Europe
Pan-European identity
Politics of Europe
Potential enlargement of the European Union
Pulse of Europe Initiative
United States of Europe
Volt Europa
WhyEurope

References

 
Centrism in Europe
European integration
Globalization
Liberalism
Liberalism in Europe
Political movements in Europe
Politics of the European Union